Medan Prijaji (Malay: Aristocrat's Forum, in modern Indonesian spelling Medan Priyayi) was a Malay-language newspaper in the Dutch East Indies founded and operated in Bandung by Tirto Adhi Soerjo between 1907 and 1912. Although it was short-lived, it was considered the first newspaper of the Indonesian National Awakening and inspired the creation of a number of other anti-colonial Malay newspapers. Tirto Adhi Soerjo's life was the basis for the Buru Quartet series of historical novels by Pramoedya Ananta Toer.

The name of the paper implies that Tirto Adhi Soerjo intended it as a discussion forum for the priyayi, the Javanese lower aristocracy who were at this time participating in the Dutch civil service and obtaining European educations because of the Dutch Ethical Policy. His healthy subscription numbers pushed him to get additional investment in 1908 by wealthy priyayi and Indonesian Chinese backers.

As historian Takashi Shiraishi puts it,

References 

Newspapers published in the Dutch East Indies
Malay-language newspapers
Defunct newspapers published in Indonesia
1907 establishments in the Dutch East Indies
1912 disestablishments in the Dutch East Indies